State Road 243 (NM 243) is a  state highway in the US state of New Mexico. NM 243's western terminus is at U.S. Route 62 (US 62) and US 180 northeast of Carlsbad, and the eastern terminus is at US 62 and US 180, which is also the western terminus of NM 176.

Major intersections

See also

References

243
Transportation in Eddy County, New Mexico
Transportation in Lea County, New Mexico